Tri Angle was an English record label based in London and New York established by Robin Carolan in 2010. The label released albums by serpentwithfeet, The Haxan Cloak, Vessel, Forest Swords, Holy Other, and Clams Casino.

History
After its inception and first set of releases, Tri Angle initially gained a reputation, with Dazed & Confused magazine calling the label "one of today’s most singular musical tribes". In 2011, Tri Angle was named one of the top 50 labels in America by Billboard, and in 2013, label owner Robin Carolan was profiled in The New Yorker. The label's releases were featured on multiple "best of" lists by notable websites and publications such as Pitchfork, The Guardian, The New York Times, Rolling Stone, and Spin.

Style and impact
Tri Angle's sound was heavily debated in the music press, with The Wire noting it as being "one of the hardest labels to pin down in contemporary music". Starting in the middle of the 2010s, artists from the label began collaborating with, and creatively partnering with, mainstream artists including Kanye West, Björk, Disclosure, A$AP Rocky, FKA Twigs, Diplo, Vince Staples, Atticus Ross, Tinashe, Massive Attack and The Weeknd. Björk in particular was a strong supporter of the label, crediting Robin Carolan with having helped her finish her eighth studio album Vulnicura, as well as collaborating with Tri Angle on a number of other occasions. In 2017, Carolan was credited on Utopia, Björk's ninth studio album, as 'the fifth ear'.

Shutdown
On April 24, 2020, Carolan released a statement via Twitter announcing that Tri Angle was officially defunct. He went on to compose the score (alongside Sebastian Gainsborough) for Robert Eggers's 2022 film The Northman.

Former artists

Adult Jazz
AlunaGeorge
Balam Acab
Boothroyd
Brood Ma
Clams Casino
Compton White
Evian Christ
Fatima Al Qadiri
Forest Swords
Fis
Future Brown
Hanz
The Haxan Cloak
Holy Other
How to Dress Well
Howse
Katie Gately
Lie
LOFT
Lotic
mmph
oOoOO
Rabit
Roly Porter
serpentwithfeet
Sd Laika
Vessel
Water Borders
WIFE

References

External links
 Official website

Electronic music record labels
American independent record labels
British independent record labels
Record labels based in London
New York (state) record labels
Record labels established in 2010
Record labels disestablished in 2020
Companies based in New York City